Rugby union in Nauru is a minor but growing sport. The national team have competed in various international competitions, including the Pacific Games.

Governing body
The governing body is an associate member of Oceania Rugby (formerly FORU), and has applied to become an associate member of World Rugby.

History
Rugby was first introduced into Nauru, by its connection with Australia and the British Empire in the 1890s. However with Australian rules football in Nauru booming in popularity from the 1910s and by 1954, local rugby and soccer leagues were all wound up without sufficient players. The newly formed South Pacific Rugby Union formed in 1969 and extended an invitation for Nauru to join, however there was no organised competition at the time.

Rugby Union was reintroduced in 2012 sports grants from the Australian Sports Outreach Program funded by Australian government AusAID and the Nauru national rugby sevens team debuted at the 2015 Pacific Games.

See also 
 Nauru national rugby union team
 Nauru national rugby union team (sevens)

References

External links
 Oceania Rugby

 
Sport in Nauru